Ivan Kuvačić (January 12, 1923 – July 20, 2014) was a Croatian Marxist sociologist and a professor emeritus at Zagreb University. He was a member of the advisory board of Praxis.

References

1923 births
Croatian sociologists
Academic staff of the University of Zagreb
2014 deaths
Yugoslav sociologists